Charles-Émile Loo (4 March 1922 – 20 August 2016) was a French politician. He served as a member of the National Assembly from 1967 to 1968, and from 1973 to 1978. He also served as a member of the European Parliament from 1979 to 1989.

References

1922 births
2016 deaths
Politicians from Marseille
French Section of the Workers' International politicians
Deputies of the 3rd National Assembly of the French Fifth Republic
Deputies of the 5th National Assembly of the French Fifth Republic
Socialist Party (France) MEPs
MEPs for France 1979–1984
MEPs for France 1984–1989